Anthony Hinnigan is a musician from Glasgow.  He is best known for his work with Michael Nyman (having been cellist for the Michael Nyman Band since 1987), Ennio Morricone, and James Horner.  He plays cello as well as Irish whistle and various Andean woodwind instruments.  Due to frequent misspellings of his surname, he is sometimes mistakenly reported as two different musicians due to the diversity of the instruments he plays.

Selected filmography
The Mission
Willow
Young Guns
Field of Dreams
Honey, I Shrunk the Kids
The Cook The Thief His Wife & Her Lover
Prospero's Books
The Michael Nyman Songbook (on-screen appearance)
Thunderheart
Patriot Games
Clear and Present Danger
Braveheart
Carrington 
Jumanji
Legends of the Fall 
Apollo 13 
The Devil's Own
The Phantom
Titanic 
The Mask of Zorro 
The End of the Affair
Wonderland
The Shipping News
The Missing 
Mighty Joe Young
Beyond Borders
The Four Feathers 
Troy
The Libertine
The Legend of Zorro
Flightplan
The New World
Apocalypto; see Apocalypto (soundtrack)

References

External links
 Official site
 
 article

Year of birth missing (living people)
Living people
Musicians from Glasgow
Scottish cellists
Woodwind musicians